Mick Leonard (born 19 October 1953) is a Scottish former professional footballer who played as a striker.

Career
Born in Glasgow, Leonard played for Glasgow Perthshire, Celtic, Sligo Rovers, Dunfermline Athletic and Pollok. In the summer of 1976 he played in the National Soccer League with Welland Lions Croatia.

References

1953 births
Living people
Scottish footballers
Glasgow Perthshire F.C. players
Celtic F.C. players
Sligo Rovers F.C. players
Dunfermline Athletic F.C. players
Pollok F.C. players
Scottish Football League players
Association football forwards
Canadian National Soccer League players
Scottish expatriate footballers
Scottish expatriate sportspeople in Ireland
Expatriate association footballers in Ireland
Scottish expatriate sportspeople in Canada
Expatriate soccer players in Canada